Crépey is a commune in the Meurthe-et-Moselle department in north-eastern France.

The altitude of the commune of Crépey ranges between 297 and 434 meters. The area of the commune is 20.90 km2.

Population and Housing 
Crépey had a population of 391 in 2019. As of 2019, there are 176 dwellings in the commune, of which 157 primary residences.

See also
Communes of the Meurthe-et-Moselle department

References 

Communes of Meurthe-et-Moselle